Garcinia burkillii is a species of flowering plant in the family Clusiaceae. It is a tree endemic to Peninsular Malaysia. It has been named after Isaac Henry Burkill.

References

burkillii
Endemic flora of Peninsular Malaysia
Trees of Peninsular Malaysia
Least concern plants
Taxonomy articles created by Polbot